Capirotada, also known as Capirotada de vigilia, is a traditional Mexican food similar to a bread pudding that is usually eaten during the Lenten period. It is one of the dishes served on Good Friday.

History 
Capirotada originated from a 15th-century Spanish dish that was heavily influenced by Moorish cuisine. Capirotada, like bread pudding, was seen as a way to make use of otherwise ruined, stale bread. Legend holds that the dish, formally known as capirotada de vigilia, was created in order to use leftovers before Lent began. The word "capirotada" comes from the Spanish word "capirote", which refers to the tall, conical hat in a religious context.

The dish traveled to the New World along with Spanish conquistadores, who spread both the Catholic religion and Spanish culture to the indigenous peoples. In post-conquest Mexico, indigenous peoples like the Aztecs used anise tea to soften stale bread and moisten dry meat, both of which were common problems on Spanish ships making the voyage across the Atlantic. Previously a more savory dish, capirotada progressively became sweeter after New World ingredients and indigenous traditions were combined with the existing Spanish version, leading to a large increase in the varieties of capirotada.

Despite originally being consumed before Lent, capirotada is now consumed during Lent, especially during Holy Week and on Good Friday.

Religious importance 
The ingredients are largely the same as those used during the 1640s to make breads and cakes. These ingredients and recipes have been recorded by the Holy Office of the Inquisition and saved to this day in the archives. The bread represents the Body of Christ, the syrup is his blood, the cloves are the nails of the cross, and the whole cinnamon sticks are the wood of the cross.  The melted cheese stands for the Holy Shroud.

Ingredients

Common ingredients 
There are various preparations of the dish. It is generally composed of toasted bolillo (which is like the French baguette) and soaked in a mulled syrup made of the following: whole cane sugar, which is known as piloncillo; clove; and cinnamon sticks.  Some of the typical ingredients include nuts, seeds, and dried (and sometimes fresh) fruits, among these are:  apples, dates, raisins, apricots, peanuts, pecans, almonds, pine nuts and walnuts. In addition, aged cheese is added, which might explain why some people's recipes call for milk.

Uncommon ingredients 
Many capirotada recipes do not include any meat due to the dish's traditional association with Lent, though some do include meat as a layer. Some versions of capirotada include tomato and onion for the syrup. Other iterations make use of cilantro, bay leaves, banana, or sprinkles.

See also
 Kugel
 List of Mexican dishes

Notes

References

External links
 Texas Mexican Secret Spanish Jews Today 

Easter food
Mexican desserts
Lenten foods
Bread puddings
Catholic cuisine